Cottier may refer to:

Surname
Cottier (surname), a name originating from the British Isles

Various
Cottier (farmer), a type of serf, also cottar, cottager